Göteborgs Atlet- och Idrottssällskap (meaning Gothenburg's Athletics and Sports Association), commonly referred to as GAIS or Gais, is a Swedish football club based in Gothenburg. The club is affiliated to the Göteborgs Fotbollförbund and play their home games at Gamla Ullevi. Fans also refers to the club as Grönsvart (green-black) or Makrillarna (the Mackerels) because of the traditional shirt colours.

GAIS is one of the oldest football clubs in Sweden. The club was a founding member of Allsvenskan and also the first champions of the league. They have won a total of four national championship titles, five league championship titles and one national cup title. Even though GAIS have played 49 seasons in Allsvenskan they only spent six years in the top division during a 30-year period from 1976 to 2005, with another six seasons of that time spent as low as the third division. The club thus gained the reputation of being a yo-yo club, constantly going up and down through the league system. After their promotion in 2005 the club played seven straight seasons in Allsvenskan which was a feat not achieved since the degradation in 1955. After relegation in 2012 they finished seventh in Superettan in 2013 and, for the exception of one season, has remained there since.

History

Formation and early glory 
GAIS was founded 11 March 1894 at Ehdlunds Café in the Gothenburg city centre. The founders had created the club for "patriotic purposes and to promote all kinds of sports". Its main activities were athletics and an assortment of strength sports. The football department was formed in 1897 and played their first official game against local rivals Örgryte IS in 1903. GAIS first appearance in the highest league at the time, Svenska Serien, was in 1915/16 where they finished in fourth place. In 1919 the club won its first national championship beating Djurgårdens IF away in the finals. The same procedure would be repeated in 1922, this time against another Stockholm team, Hammarby IF. GAIS won the first season of the new first tier league Allsvenskan in 1924/25, two points ahead of local rivals IFK Göteborg. The feat was to be repeated in 1926/27, this time three points ahead of IFK Göteborg. The league champions was not recognised as national champions until the 1930/31 season. GAIS won this year as well, six points ahead of AIK and IFK Göteborg.

During the 1930s GAIS slowly lost the dominance the club had exercised over Allsvenskan since its foundation and in 1938 the club was relegated. Having spent three years in the second division GAIS returned with a vengeance for the 1941–42 Allsvenskan where the club finished in second place. Later in 1942 they won Svenska Cupen for the first, and until today, only time.

The club then stayed in Allsvenskan throughout the 1940s and the early 1950s. They quite unexpectedly won their fourth national championship one single point ahead of Helsingborgs IF in the season of 1953/54. The clinching game was the last one of the season; a nail biting no score draw at Stadsparksvallen in Jönköping. The following year, equally unexpectedly, when the club finished third last and was relegated.

1960s and 1970s 

GAIS returned to Allsvenskan the following 1955/56 season but from the mid-1950s the club lost its former continuity and never spent more than five years in a row in Allsvenskan until the 2000s. The club was relegated again in 1959 and spent four seasons in the second division only to return briefly to Allsvenskan for one year in 1964. After that relegation they immediately returned to Allsvenskan in 1966. GAIS then remained there during 1966–1975, except for one year in the second division in 1971. In 1975 the club made its first appearance in the UEFA Cup playing Śląsk Wrocław in the first leg. GAIS lost out to the Polish club after winning 2–1 at home but losing 2–4 away. The same year GAIS got relegated from Allsvenskan for the sixth time, this time due to scoring two goals less than Halmstads BK.

Thirty years of underperformance: 1976–2006 
The relegation in 1975 would in retrospect prove to be a turning point for the worse in the history of GAIS. Unable to qualify for Allsvenskan in 1976, and furthermore losing the qualifying spot to now arch-rivals IFK Göteborg, they lost the position as Gothenburg's leading team that they had enjoyed throughout the early 1970s. The club then consistently failed to qualify for Allsvenskan during the following five years and in 1981 the club got relegated to the Swedish third division due to economical problems and a surprisingly weak performance by the squad. The future looked bleak after GAIS failed to return to the second division in 1982 but due to a massive performance in the latter part of the 1983 season the club secured the qualifying spot seven points ahead of IK Oddevold and then beat Mönsterås GoIF in the promotion playoffs to the second division.

In 1984 GAIS made what was to become one of the club's most spectacular signings to this date. Tunisian midfielder Samir Bakaou left his former club Étoile Sportive du Sahel to join the Gothenburg side and proved to be the injection of flair and energy that the club had been needing so badly. With "the Black Pearl" as playmaker and notorious goalscorer GAIS was once again a force to be reckoned with and made it to the promotion playoffs to Allsvenskan in 1985, only to lose out to Djurgårdens IF after a penalty shoot-out in a highly controversial game. GAIS finally made it back to Allsvenskan in 1987 ending eleven long years of struggling in the lower divisions. For the second time in club history GAIS made it to the finals of Svenska Cupen as well, but lost out 2–0 to opposing side Kalmar FF.

During the late 1980s and early 1990s GAIS mostly fought for its survival in Allsvenskan. With the exception of a third place in 1989 the club had to settle for the lower half of the league table. Relegation followed in the season of 1992 and GAIS yet again had to face a long and tortuous walk through the Swedish second division. The nadir was reached in 1997 when the club had been relegated to the third division and ran a huge economical deficit while only finishing third in the league. This season would be the starting point of possibly the worst yo-yo experience any Swedish football club has ever experienced.

GAIS was promoted to the second division in 1998 and made it back to Allsvenskan after the season of 1999 by finishing in second place and defeating Kalmar FF in the qualifying round. After finishing second to last in the 2000 Allsvenskan the club continued its fall through the second division Superettan in 2001 and was relegated to the third division for the 2002 season. From there on things slowed down when GAIS failed to make a quick return during their first season there. Then after a hard-fought battle throughout 2003 against local competitors Ljungskile SK GAIS finally ended up winning the series by goal difference. In the promotion playoffs to qualify for Superettan the club faced Mjällby AIF and defeated them 2–1 away as well as home.

The next year GAIS signed Roland Nilsson as head coach, and with him at the lead the club finished in sixth place of the 2004 Superettan. During the following season, facing competition from newly relegated AIK and Östers IF, GAIS managed to finish third and got to play Landskrona BoIS in the promotion playoffs to Allsvenskan. After beating Landskrona 2–1 at home and drawing them 0–0 in an extremely tight away game, where GAIS forward Wilton Figueiredo got his second yellow card after 30 minutes of play and manager Roland Nilsson substituted defender Kenneth Gustafsson for himself during the last 25 minutes, GAIS finally got to make their return to Allsvenskan. There they would spend their next seven seasons but after a strong fifth-place finish in 2011 they ended up in last place and relegated in 2012. They have since remained in the swedish second tier.

Supporters and rivalries 

According to polls GAIS are the second most supported club in Gothenburg, with 12% of the people in the city who follow a football team claiming to have GAIS as their favorite side. Their supporters have traditionally been perceived as coming from the working class-districts of Gothenburg and having left wing sympathies, even though research on the subject couldn't conclude that this were more true than for other clubs. Their supporters are also perceived as being loyal, despite whatever hardships the club may face. The oldest and primary GAIS supporter group is called Makrillarna (meaning the Mackerels) and was founded in 1961.

During the 2018 season the club chose to allow a supporter to act as an assisting manager for a single game, against Halmstads BK in September, which at the time were unique amongst Swedish football clubs.

The club and its supporters harbour a fierce rivalry with Gothenburg's other traditional working-class team IFK Göteborg. Attendance rates are normally around 4500–7000 when playing in top tier Allsvenskan and 3000–4000 in second tier Superettan with greater numbers attending against local rivals IFK Göteborg, Örgryte IS and IF Elfsborg as well as the biggest teams from Stockholm and Skåne.

Players

First-team squad

Retired numbers 
15 – Fredrik Lundgren, defender and midfielder (1999–2002, 2003–2012)

Notable players 
Karl-Alfred Jacobsson has been selected as both player of the century" and player of the millennium by GAIS fans. The GAIS player of the year award "The Honorary Mackerel" has presented by the supporter group Makrillarna at the end of each season since 1961. The following players have received the award:

 Frank Jacobsson
 Leif Andersson
 Bo Palle
 Gunnar Gren
 Leif Forsberg
 Leif Wendt
 Kurt Axelsson
 Kent Grek
 Jan Olsson
 Hasse Samuelsson
 Hasse Johansson
 Sten Pålsson
 Kjell Uppling
 Eine Fredriksson
 Sune Persson
 Nils Norlander
 Mikael Johansson
 Mikael Berthagen
 Morgan Lagemyr
 Osborn Larsson
 Lallo Fernandez
 Håkan Lindman
 Niklas Sjöstedt
 Samir Bakaou
 Sören Järelöv
 Ulf Johansson
 Steve Gardner
 Tony Persson
 Jens Wålemark
 Lenna Kreivi
 Erik Holmgren
 Tinos Lappas
 Thomas Hallberg
 Stefan Martinsen
 Niclas Johansson
 Mårten Jonsson
 Per Johansson
 Magnus Gustafsson
 Thomas Hvenfelt
 Anders Holmberg
 Ivan Ottordahl
 Mathias Gravem
 Ville Viljanen
 Stefan Vennberg
 Fredrik Lundgren
 Dime Jankulovski
 Richard Ekunde
 Bobbie Friberg da Cruz
 Wánderson
 Kenneth Gustafsson
 Eric Bassombeng
 Lars Göthfelt
 Joel Anell

Managers 

 Knut Holmberg (1938–42)
 Gösta Holmberg (1940–41)
 Helge Liljebjörn (1941–43)
 Holger Jernsten (1943–49)
 George Raynor (1947–48)
 Willy Wolf (1949–51)
 Helge Ahlström (1951–52)
 Sven Jacobsson (1952–54)
 Gösta Hallberg (1954–56)
 Sixten Rosenqvist (1955–57)
 Karl-Erik Grahn (1956–59)
 Curt Thorstensson (1960–61)
 István Takács (1962)
 Gunnar Gren (1963–64)
 Holger Hansson (1965–67)
 Gunnar Gren (1968–69)
 Holger Hansson (1970–72)
 Vilmos Várszegi (1973–76)
 Rune Jingård (1976)
 Arne Lindqvist (1977)
 Lars Hedén (1978–79)
 Tom Lilledal (1980)
 Bosse Nilsson (1981)
 Bo Falk (1982–92)
 Bengt-Arne Strömberg (1993–96)
 Hans Gren (1997–98)
 Lennart Ottordal (1999–00)
 Kent Kierdorf (2001)
 Lennart Ottordal (2001–02)
 Roberto Jacobsson (2003)
 Roland Nilsson (2004–07)
 Magnus Pehrsson (2008)
 Alexander Axén (2009 – Jul 2012)
 Jan Mak (Aug–Oct 2012)
 Benjamin Westman (Oct–Dec 2012)
 Thomas Askebrand (2013–2014)
 Per-Ola Ljung (2014 – Aug 2015)
 Jesper Ljung (Aug–Dec 2015)
 Benjamin Westman (2016–2017)
 Patrik Ingelsten (Jun–Jul 2017)
 Bosko Orovic (2017 – Jul 2019)
 Patrik Ingelsten (Jul–Sep 2019)
 Tomas Erixon (Sep–Dec 2019)
 Stefan Jacobsson (Dec 2019–Nov 2021) 
 Fredrik Holmberg (Nov 2021–)

Achievements

Domestic 
 Swedish Champions
 Winners (4): 1919, 1922, 1930–31, 1953–54

League 

 Allsvenskan:
 Winners (4): 1924–1925, 1926–1927, 1930–1931, 1953–1954
 Runners-up (4): 1925–1926, 1932–1933, 1933–1934, 1941–1942
 Division 1 Södra:
 Winners (1): 1987
 Runners-up (2): 1995, 1999
 Svenska Serien:
 Winners (1): 1923–1924

Cups 

 Svenska Cupen:
 Winners (1): 1942
 Runners-up (1): 1986–1987
 Svenska Mästerskapet:
 Winners (2): 1919, 1922

European 
 Intertoto Cup:
 Winners (1): 1990

Footnotes

References

External links 

  of GAIS
 Gronsvartgbg.se – Supporters' site

 
Allsvenskan clubs
Association football clubs established in 1897
Football clubs in Gothenburg
Sports clubs established in 1894
1894 establishments in Sweden
Football clubs in Västra Götaland County
Svenska Cupen winners